The 2006–07 Moldovan National Division was the 16th season of top-tier football in Moldova.

Overview
FC Sheriff Tiraspol won their seventh consecutive championship, with the league having expanded to include ten teams for the first time since the 1999–2000 season.

League standings

NB: no relegation as top level extended to 12 clubs

Results

First and second round

Third and fourth round

Top goalscorers

References
Moldova - List of final tables (RSSSF)
 Divizia Națională 2006-2007 at soccerway
 Statistica Generala Divizia Națională 2006-2007 - www.divizianationala.com
 Arhiva campionatelor Moldovei - FMF.md
 Divizia Națională 2006-2007 at betexplorer

Moldovan Super Liga seasons
1
Moldova